Andon Qesari (27 June 1942 – 13 February 2021) was an Albanian actor and stage director. He made a handful of films as an actor, and was also known for his work in theater. The government of Albania declared him to be an Artist of Merit.

Filmography
Gadhnjim mbi vdekjen (1967)
Gjurma (1970)
Në fillim të verës (1975)
Pylli i lirisë (1976)
Ata ishin kater (1977)
Dëshmorët e monumenteve (1980)
Tela për violinë (1987)
Në emër të lirisë (1987)
Dashuria e fundit (1995)

References

External links
 

1942 births
2021 deaths
People from Himara
Albanian theatre directors
Albanian male stage actors
Albanian male film actors
Albanian male voice actors
Merited Artists of Albania
20th-century Albanian male actors
Place of death missing